Frank Hillard Walton (9 April 1918 – 2 December 1986) was an English footballer who played as a left back.

Career
Walton began his professional career at Southend United, for whom he played for at youth level, following a short stint with Chelmsford. Walton made 144 appearances in the Football League for Southend, without scoring, before moving onto Dartford in 1951. Walton later played in the Southend Borough Combination.

Following his playing career, Walton became chairman of Southend United in 1978. The South Stand at Southend's Roots Hall ground is named after Walton.

References

1918 births
1986 deaths
Association football defenders
English footballers
Sportspeople from Southend-on-Sea
Chelmsford City F.C. players
Southend United F.C. players
Dartford F.C. players
English Football League players
English football chairmen and investors